OJC may refer to:

 Central Ojibwa language (ISO 639-3 designation)
 Johnson County Executive Airport (IATA airport code)
 Operation Just Cause, the 1989–1990 United States invasion of Panama
 Original Jazz Classics, an American record label
 Otero College (formerly Otero Junior College), La Junta, Colorado, US
 Reichenberg Fellowship (German: Offensive Junger Christen), a German non-denominational ecumenical community